Rick Mora (born January 22, 1975) is an American model and actor. 

He claims Apache and Yaqui descent.

Filmography
 Turok: Son of Stone (2008)
 "I Need You Now" video (song sung by Agnes) (2009)
 The Dead and the Damned (2010)
 Big Money Rustlas (2010)
 Yellow Rock (2011)
 Avenged (2013)

References

External links
 
 

1975 births
Living people
American male actors of Mexican descent
American people of Yaqui descent
American people of Apache descent
California State University, Northridge alumni
American male actors
American male models